Komen may refer to:

Places
 Komen, a settlement in Slovenia
 Comines, Nord, (Dutch: Komen), a commune in France
 Comines-Warneton, (Dutch: Komen-Waasten), a Belgian city and municipality

People with the surname Komen
Daniel Komen (born 1976), Kenyan long-distance track runner and 1997 world champion
Daniel Kipchirchir Komen (born 1984), Kenyan middle-distance runner
Willy Komen (born 1987), Kenyan steeplechase runner

Organizations
Susan G. Komen for the Cure, breast cancer awareness organization
Susan G. Komen 3-Day for the Cure

Kenyan names